Pangborn Memorial Airport  is in Douglas County, Washington, four miles east of Wenatchee, a city in Chelan County. The airport is owned by the Ports of Chelan and Douglas Counties.

The airport is used for general aviation and is served by one airline (Horizon Air), offering in-state service.  SeaPort Airlines served the airport until winter 2012. As of September 28, 2006, Pangborn Memorial began supporting ILS (Instrument Landing System) approaches.

Pangborn Memorial Airport is named for Clyde Pangborn, who in 1931 was the first pilot to fly non-stop across the Pacific Ocean. Taking off from Misawa, Aomori, Japan with an intended destination of Seattle, he and his co-pilot, Hugh Herndon Jr., instead landed in Wenatchee.

Facilities
Pangborn Memorial Airport covers 665 acres (269 ha) at an elevation of 1,249 feet (381 m). It has two asphalt runways: 12/30, the only operational runway, is 7,000 by 150 feet (2,134 x 46 m). The former Runway 7/25 is closed; it was 4,460 by 75 feet (1,359 x 23 m).

Expansion plans
In 2009 the FAA recommended and approved an expansion of the Pangborn runway to 7,000 feet.

Airline and destination

In 2008 the airport had 44,681 aircraft operations, average 122 per day: 69% general aviation, 29% air taxi, 2% airline and <1% military. 132 aircraft were then based at this airport: 67% single-engine, 9% multi-engine, 10% jet, 2% helicopter, 11% glider and 1% ultralight.

Passenger

In July 2018 Pangborn began working towards getting a direct flight to and from San Francisco.

Cargo

Statistics

Top destinations

References

External links
 Pangborn Memorial Airport, official site
 Pangborn Memorial Airport at WSDOT Aviation
 

Airports in Washington (state)
Transportation buildings and structures in Douglas County, Washington
Transportation in Chelan County, Washington
Buildings and structures in Wenatchee, Washington